Paul Bender (28 July 1875 – 25 November 1947) was a German operatic bass.

Life 
Born in Driedorf, Westerwald, as the son of a Protestant minister, Bender began his vocal training while studying medicine in Berlin. His music instructors were Luise Ress and Baptist Hoffmann. Already by 1900, Bender made his stage debut at the Breslau Opera. In 1903 he moved to the Münchner Hofoper, where he remained for the rest of his life, in September 1943 celebrating his 40-year anniversary as a member of the ensemble. Altogether he trod the stage more than 2000 times.

In Munich, Bender sang practically all the important bass roles and also performed as a Heldenbariton. His repertory altogether included not fewer than 118 roles. He took part in many premieres, among them Le donne curiose  in 1903 and I quatro rusteghi  in 1906, both by Ermanno Wolf-Ferrari. He shone as Pope Pius V in the first performances of Hans Pfitzner's Palestrina in 1917 at the Prinzregententheater. Other premieres were Die Gespenstersonate by Julius Weismann (1930), Das Herz by Hans Pfitzner (1931) and Der Mond by Carl Orff (1939).

From 1902 Bender was a regular guest of the Richard-Wagner-Festspiele in Bayreuth. His reputation sealed by guest appearances at Théàtre de la Monnaie Brussels (1910), Théâtre des Champs-Élysées Paris (1914), the Vienna State Opera or Hofoper (1916–17), Covent Garden Opera London (1910–1914), and Stadttheater Zürich (1915), from 1922 to 1927 he was invited to the Metropolitan Opera in New York. In 1926 Bender was a guest at the Salzburger Festspiele, and in 1938 and 1939 performed in Der Ring des Nibelungen at La Scala.

Lieder and concert singing was also a great passion of Bender's, even before being named Royal Bavarian Kammersänger in 1907. As a singer of narrative ballads he was lauded as a successor to Eugen Gura. In neither opera nor concert singing did Bender rely on his impressive voice alone; for him the dramatic element was always important. The extent of his mimetic gift can be judged from his playing of a principal role in one of the most significant expressionistic silent films, 1919's Nerven by Robert Reinert. (This film dramatized the misery of the postwar era so powerfully that audiences became hysterical and the work was banned.)

The singer appeared on the stage till shortly before his death. In the 1930s and 40s he was primarily busy as a professor at the Münchner Akademie der Tonkunst (now part of the Hochschule für Musik und Theater). Among his pupils belong Josef Greindl and Hans Hopf. Bender married the soprano Paula Brand, who thereafter gave up her career. Bender died in Munich and his grave is in the Munich Waldfriedhof.

Selected roles 

 Die Zauberflöte (Wolfgang Amadeus Mozart): Sarastro
 Die Entführung aus dem Serail (Wolfgang Amadeus Mozart): Osmin
 Don Giovanni (Wolfgang Amadeus Mozart): Commendatore
 Das Rheingold (Richard Wagner): Fasolt; Fafner
 Götterdämmerung (Richard Wagner): Hagen
 Tristan und Isolde (Richard Wagner): König Marke
 Die Meistersinger von Nürnberg (Richard Wagner): Veit Pogner; Hans Sachs
 Parsifal (Richard Wagner): Gurnemanz; Amfortas 
 Tannhäuser (Richard Wagner): Landgraf
 Der fliegende Holländer (Richard Wagner): Daland
 Der Barbier von Sevilla (Gioachino Rossini): Basilio
 Der Waffenschmied (Albert Lortzing): Hans Stadinger
 Martha (Friedrich von Flotow): Plumkett
 Der Barbier von Bagdad (Peter Cornelius): Barbier
 Der Rosenkavalier (Richard Strauss): Ochs von Lerchenau
 Don Quichotte (Jules Massenet): Don Quichotte
 Fidelio (Ludwig van Beethoven): Rocco
 Der Mond (Carl Orff): Petrus
 Palestrina (Hans Pfitzner): Papst Pius V

Discography 
 Lebendige Vergangenheit – Paul Bender. CD, Preiser/Naxos, Wien 1999
 Aus Münchens Operngeschichte, 4 CDs, Preiser/Naxos, Wien 1999
 Sie sangen im Prinzregentheater, 3 CDs, Preiser/Naxos, Wien 2001
 Symposium Opera Coll.10 – Paul Bender, CD, Symposium/Scherzando, 2006

References

External links

1875 births
1947 deaths
People from Lahn-Dill-Kreis
Burials at Munich Waldfriedhof
German operatic basses